The 1926 Tulsa Golden Hurricane football team represented the University of Tulsa during the 1926 college football season. In their second year under head coach Gus Henderson, the Golden Hurricane compiled a 7–2 record and outscored their opponents by a total of 169 to 56.

Schedule

References

Tulsa
Tulsa Golden Hurricane football seasons
Tulsa Golden Hurricane football